Mesasteria is a monotypic moth genus of the family Erebidae. Its only species, Mesasteria sanguilinea, is found in Borneo. Both the genus and the species were first described by George Hampson in 1926.

References

Calpinae
Monotypic moth genera